Sarah-Léonie Cysique (born 6 July 1998 in Sarcelles) is a French judoka from Guadeloupe. She won the silver medal in the women's 57 kg event at the 2020 Summer Olympics in Tokyo, Japan. She also won the gold medal in the mixed team event.

Career 
She won a medal at the 2019 World Judo Championships.

In 2020, she won one of the bronze medals in the women's 57 kg event at the 2020 European Judo Championships held in Prague, Czech Republic. In 2021, she won the silver medal in her event at the 2021 Judo World Masters held in Doha, Qatar.

She represented France at the 2020 Summer Olympics.

References

External links
 

1998 births
Living people
French female judoka
Olympic judoka of France
Judoka at the 2020 Summer Olympics
Medalists at the 2020 Summer Olympics
Olympic medalists in judo
Olympic silver medalists for France
Olympic gold medalists for France